A list of British films released in 1920.

1920

See also
 1920 in film
 1920 in the United Kingdom

References

External links
 

1920
Films
British
1920s in British cinema